Dry Brook may refer to:

New Jersey, United States
 Dry Brook (Paulins Kill tributary)

New York, United states
 Dry Brook (Cannonsville Reservoir tributary)
 Dry Brook (Corbett, New York)
 Dry Brook (East Branch Delaware River)
 Dry Brook (East Brook)
 Dry Brook (Elk Creek tributary)
 Dry Brook (Horton Brook tributary)
 Dry Brook (Read Creek)
 Dry Brook (Sands Creek tributary)
 Dry Brook (Trout Brook tributary)
 Dry Brook Ridge, a ridge in the Catskill Mountains

See also
 Dry Creek (disambiguation)
 Dry River (disambiguation)